Al-Ahram (Arabic: ألأهرام, "The Pyramids") may refer to:

 Al-Ahram, a daily newspaper published in Cairo, Egypt
 Al-Ahram Beverage Company, a Heineken brand
 Al-Ahram Center for Political and Strategic Studies
 Al-Ahram Foundation

See also 
 Ahram (disambiguation)